This is a list of notable people who were born, or lived for a significant period of time, in Calgary, Alberta, Canada, ordered by last name:

A 
 William Aberhart (1878–1943), former Premier of Alberta
 Tesho Akindele (born 1992), soccer player
 David Albahari (born 1948), Serbian-born author
 Jocelyn Alice, vocalist for the soul pop duo Jocelyn & Lisa
 Cody Almond (born 1989), Canadian-born Swiss professional ice hockey centre
 Jaret Anderson-Dolan (born 1999), ice hockey player
 Brooke Apshkrum (born 1999), luger
 Jann Arden (born 1962), singer
 William Charles Gordon Armstrong (1865–1951), real estate magnate and municipal politician
 Mark Astley (born 1969), former NHL player

B 
 Scott Bailey (born 1972), ice hockey goaltender
 Cori Bartel (born 1971), curler
 Daniel Bartholomew-Poyser, orchestral conductor
 Bob Bassen (born 1965), NHL forward
 Hank Bassen (1932–2009), former NHL goalie
 Nolan Baumgartner (born 1976), professional ice hockey player
 Ian Willoughby Bazalgette (1918–1944), Calgary-born recipient of the Victoria Cross for actions in the skies above France in the Second World War
 Jay Beagle (born 1985), former NHL player
 Jake Bean (born 1998) NHL player (Columbus Blue Jackets)
 Chelsey Bell (born 1982), curler
 Jill Belland, television host and producer
 Richard Bennett (1870–1947), former prime minister of Canada
 Cheryl Bernard (born 1966), curler
 Manmeet Bhullar (1980–2015), Progressive Conservative politician
 Earle Birney (1904–1995), poet
 Jason Block (born 1989), swimmer
 Heather Blush, singer
 Bruce Boa (1930–2004), actor
 Bill Borger (born 1974), first Canadian to both swim the English Channel and climb Mount Everest
 Noah Bowman (born 1992), freestyle skiing
 Trevor Boys (born 1957), NASCAR driver
 Paul Brandt (born 1972), Country Music Singer
 Annie Glen Broder (1857–1937), musician, writer and lecturer
 Dave Bronconnier (born 1962), politician
 Aanders Brorson (born 1988), American curler
 Anastasia Bucsis (born 1989), speed skater
 Nate Burleson (born 1981), professional American football player, Detroit Lions
 Pat Burns (1856–1937), rancher, businessman, and Canadian Senator
 Ron Butlin (1925–2014), ice hockey executive

C 
 Don Cairns (born 1955), professional ice hockey player
 Eric Cameron (born 1935), visual artist
 Tommy Campbell (born 1978), actor and stand-up comedian
Cartel Madras, hip-hop duo
 Sean Cheesman, dancer and choreographer
 David Chernushenko (born 1963), politician
 Dean Chynoweth (born 1968), ice hockey defenceman
 Aleisha Cline (born 1970), cross skier
 Allen Coage (1943–2007), professional wrestler known as "Bad News Allen"
 Braydon Coburn (born 1985), ice hockey defenceman
 Joe Colborne (born 1990), ice hockey forward
 Jordan Connor (born 1991), actor, most well known for his role as Sweet Pea from the hit CW series "Riverdale".
 Paul Cranmer (born 1969), former CFL player
 Ted Cruz (born 1970), U.S. Senator from Texas since 2013 and ex-Republican Presidential nomination candidate during 2016 election. Moved to Houston, Texas at age 4.
 Elisha Cuthbert (born 1982), actress, moved to Montreal at a very young age, and remained there until she moved to Los Angeles
 Mike Cvik (born 1962), former National Hockey League linesman

D 
 Nathan Dales, actor
 Carolyn Darbyshire (born 1963), curler
 Stu Davis (1921–2007), aka Canada's Cowboy Troubadour, home base was Calgary 1946-48; 51-56
 Carol-Anne Day (born 1986), voice actress
 Theo de Raadt (born 1968), founder and head of the OpenBSD project
 Kris Demeanor, poet, musician and actor
 Justin Dorey (born 1988), freestyle skier
 Bruce Dowbiggin, journalist for the Calgary Herald
 Michael Dowse (born 1973), film director
 Mathew Dumba, ice hockey player
 Kyle Bobby Dunn (born 1986), composer and musician, raised in Lake Bonavista and based in Brooklyn
 Micki DuPont (born 1980), ice hockey defenseman
 Jacqueline Dupuis, Executive Director of Calgary International Film Festival
 Erica Durance (born 1978), actress, born in Calgary but raised in Three Hills
 Aaron Durley (born 1993), baseball and basketball player

E 
 Earl Silverman (born 1948), Domestic Abuse Survivor and Men's Rights Advocate.
Patrick Eaves (born 1984), Canadian-American professional ice hockey forward
 Adam Edelman (born 1991), American-born four-time Israeli National Champion in skeleton event, and Israeli Olympian
 Samuel Edney (born 1984), luger
 Travis Ehrhardt (born 1989), ice hockey defenceman
 Ophira Eisenberg (born 1972), comedian, writer, actress, and host of NPR quiz show Ask Me Another
 Lindsay Ell (born 1989), singer
 Brennan Elliott (born 1975), actor 
Esi Edugyan (born 1978), writer
 Darren Espanto (born 2001), Filipino-Canadian child singer
 Shawn Everett (born 1982), Grammy-winning Canadian music engineer and producer
 Erik Everhard (born 1976), pornographic actor
 Lance Evers (born 1969), professional wrestler known as "Lance Storm"

F 
 John Fairbairn (born 1983), Olympic skeleton racer
 Leslie Feist (born 1976), singer/songwriter born in Amherst, Nova Scotia, then moved to Calgary as a child
 John Fennell (born 1995), luger
 Brandon Firla, actor
 Rhiannon Fish (born 1991), Canadian-born Australian actress
 George Fox (born 1960), country music singer/songwriter

G 
 Bill Gadsby (1927–2016), professional ice hockey defenceman
 Dutch Gainor (1904–1962), ice hockey forward
 TJ Galiardi (born 1988), Canadian-born American professional ice hockey forward
 William Garden (1918–2011), Canadian and American naval architect and marine engineer
 Ruth M. Gardiner (1914–1943), first nurse killed in action during World War II
 Karyn Garossino (born 1965), professional ice dancer with partner Rod Garossino
 Lynn Garrison (born 1937), aviator, author and mercenary
 Austin Gary (born 1947), author and songwriter
 Mark Gatha (born 1974), former voice actor
 Lucas Gilbertson, voice actor
 Onalea Gilbertson, voice actress
 Jeff Glass (born 1985), professional ice hockey goaltender
 John Glenn (1833–1886), Calgary's earliest recorded European settler
 James Gosling (born 1955), creator of the Java programming language
 Alex Gough (born 1987), luger
 Mike Green (born 1985), professional hockey player (Detroit Red Wings)
 Mary Greene (1843–1933), mother superior and educator, established first Roman Catholic school board in Alberta
 Tyrel Griffith (born 1985), curler
 Rosalind Groenewoud (born 1989), freeskier
 Paul Gross (born 1959), actor

H 
John Hall (born 1943), artist
Joice M. Hall (born 1943), artist
Taylor Hall (born 1991), professional hockey player (Boston Bruins)
 Eric Hansen (born 1992), chess player
 Nicole Hare
 Owen Hargreaves (born 1981), professional footballer, played for Bayern Munich, Manchester United and Manchester City
 Stephen Harper (born 1959), former prime minister of Canada and former leader of the Conservative Party of Canada
 Richard Harrison, poet
 Bret Hart (born 1957), professional wrestler
 Owen Hart (1965–1999), professional wrestler
 Stu Hart (1915–2003), professional wrestler, promoter and trainer
 Teddy Hart (born 1980), professional wrestler
 Dany Heatley (born 1981), professional ice hockey player (Minnesota Wild)
 Ben Hebert (born 1983), curler
 Stuart Hilborn (1917–2013), automotive engineer
 Greyston Holt (born 1985), actor
 Tony Holyoake (born 1946), darts player
 Kaillie Humphries (born 1985), bobsledder
 Tim Hunter (born 1960), professional National Hockey League player (won the Stanley Cup with the Flames in 1989)
 Nancy Huston (born 1953), novelist born in Calgary; left at age 15
 Bill Hutton (1910–1974), ice hockey defenceman
 Wayne Hynes (born 1969), Canadian-born German ice hockey player

I 
 Kaylin Irvine (born 1990), speedskater

J 
 Tom Jackson (born 1948), Métis actor, singer and entrepreneur
 Connor James (born 1982), ice hockey centre
 Roy Jenson (1927–2007), actor
 Arianne Jones (born 1990), luger
 Mark de Jonge (born 1984), sprint canoeist
 Gilmore Junio (born 1990), Olympic speedskater

K 
 James Keelaghan (born 1959), musician
 Jessica Parker Kennedy (born 1984), actress
 Tyson Kidd (born 1980), professional wrestler
 Kiesza (full name Kiesza Rae Ellestad) (born 1989), musician and multi-instrumentalist
 Lance Kinsey (born 1954), actor and screenwriter
 Yuri Kisil (born 1995), swimmer
 Ralph Klein (1942–2013), former Mayor of Calgary and former Premier of Alberta
 Cody Ko (born 1990), comedian and actor
 Joe Kryczka (1934–1991), Justice of the Court of Queen's Bench of Alberta, president of the Canadian Amateur Hockey Association
 John Kucera (born 1984), alpine ski racer
 Larry Kwong (1923–2018), professional hockey player
 Norman Kwong (1929–2016), former CFL player and former Lieutenant Governor of Alberta

L 
 Brent Ladds (born 1951), president of the Canadian Junior Hockey League
 Kyle Landry (born 1986), basketball player
 Alvin Law (born 1960), motivational speaker
 Sheena Lawrick (born 1983), Olympic softball player
 Brett Leason (born 1999), Canadian ice hockey player
 Brady Leman (born 1986), freestyle skier
 Herbie Lewis (1906–1991), ice hockey left winger
 Jan Lisiecki (born 1995), classical pianist
 Sam Livingston (1831–1897), Irish-born early settler in Calgary
 James Alexander Lougheed (1854–1925), head of military hospitals during World War I
 Peter Lougheed (1928–2012), former CFL player and Premier of Alberta
 Lowell, electropop musician
 Ed Lukowich (born 1946), curler
 Keith Loach (born 1975), Canadian Olympic Skeleton Athlete 2006
 Oscar Lopez (born 1953), Latin guitarist musician
 Alexandria Loutitt (born 2004), Canadian ski jumper and 2023 World champion in ski jumping, large hill

M 

 Jinder Mahal (born 1986), professional wrestler
 Cale Makar (born 1998), professional hockey player
 John Mann (1962–2019), lead singer of Canadian folk band Spirit of the West
 Ernest Manning (1908–1996), former Premier of Alberta
 Heather Marks (born 1988), supermodel
 Deb Matejicka, journalist
 Wayne McBean (born 1969), ice hockey defenceman
 Frederick McCall (1896–1949), World War I fighter ace, businessman, stuntman
 Trent McClellan, comedian
 Nellie McClung (1873–1951), writer and activist
 Frank McCool (1918–1973), ice hockey goaltender
 Bruce McCulloch (born 1961), comedian, writer, director
 Todd McFarlane (born 1961), creator of the Spawn series of comics
 Kevin McKenna (born 1980), professional soccer player
 Rita McKeough (born 1951), visual artist
 Brian McKeever (born 1979), cross-country skier and biathlete
 Brent McMurtry (born 1986), cross-country skier
 Taylor McNallie (born 1990 or 1991) anti-racism activist
 Victor A. McPherson (born 1928), 27th Canadian Surgeon General
 Tate McRae (born 2003), singer and dancer
 Caitlynne Medrek (born 1989), professional actress and voice over artist
 Manjit Minhas (born 1980), entrepreneur, television personality and venture capitalist
 Eric Mitchell (born 1992), ski jumper
 Chris Moffat (born 1979), luger
 Mike Moffat (born 1982), luger
 Darren Moulding (born 1982), curler
 Cory Monteith (1982–2013), singer and actor; born in Calgary but grew up in Vancouver
 Michelle Morgan (born 1981), actress and singer
 Trevor Morrice (born 1991), ski jumper
 Josh Morrissey (born 1995), ice hockey defenceman
 Caia Morstad (born) 1982), volleyball player
 Erín Moure (born 1955), poet and translator
 Troy Murray (born 1962), ice hockey centre
 Dana Murzyn (born 1966), ice hockey defenceman
 Curtis Myden (born 1973), Olympic bronze medalist swimmer
 Tyler Myers (born 1990), professional hockey player

N 
 Issey Nakajima-Farran (born 1984), professional soccer player
 Jim Neidhart (1955–2018), professional wrestler
 Natalie "Nattie" Neidhart (born 1982), professional wrestler for WWE, Former WWE Divas Champion, Former WWE SmackDown Women's Champion, and 1/2 of the duo The Divas of Doom. Star of Total Divas on E!
 Naheed Nenshi (born 1972), Former Mayor of Calgary
 Robert Nilsson (born 1985), Canadian-born Swedish professional ice hockey forward
 Kyle Nissen (born 1979), freestyle skier
 Amy Nixon (born 1977), curler
 Henry Grattan Nolan (1893–1957), lawyer and soldier
 Rebecca Northan, actress
 Baldy Northcott (1908–1986), ice hockey left winger
 Lawrence Nycholat (born 1979), ice hockey player
 Alexander Nylander (born 1998), Canadian-born Swedish ice hockey winger
 William Nylander (born 1996), Canadian-born Swedish professional ice hockey player

O 
 Susan O'Connor (born 1977), curler
 Steven Ogg (born 1973), actor
 Kevin Ogilvie (born 1962), vocalist for the Industrial music band Skinny Puppy
 Peter Oldring (born 1971), actor
 Melissa O'Neil (born 1988), actress and 2005 Canadian Idol winner The Rookie, actress 
 Nicole Orford (born 1992), ice dancer

P 
 Kathleen Parlow (1890–1963), violinist
 Jim Peplinski (born 1960), former professional hockey player (Calgary Flames)
 Chris Phillips (born 1978), professional hockey player (Ottawa Senators)
 Andrew Phung, actor best known for his role on Kim's Convenience
 Gerry Pinder (born 1948), professional hockey player
 Domenic Pittis (born 1974), ice hockey centre
 Brian Pockar (1959–1992), figure skater
 Lanny Poffo (born 1954), former professional wrestler
 Pierre Poilievre (born 1979), Member of Parliament for Carleton
 Brayden Point (born 1996), professional ice hockey centre
 Glenn Price, conductor
 Al Purvis (1929–2009), assistant captain of the Edmonton Mercurys

Q 
 Tegan and Sara (both born 1980), aka indie-pop duo Tegan and Sara Quin, best known for their work as professional musicians

R 
 Kayla Rivera (born 1991), singer
 Raghav (born 1981), singer-songwriter
 Lobsang Rampa (1910–1981), Tibetan lama
 Heather Rankin (born 1965), curler
 Chris Reitsma (born 1977), professional baseball player
Michelle Rempel Garner (born 1980), Canadian politician
 Nick Ring (born 1979), professional MMA fighter UFC
 Chris Robanske (born 1989), snowboarder
 Mat Robinson (born 1986), professional ice hockey defenceman
 Steve Rodehutskors (1963–2007), football player
 Mike Rogers (born 1954), ice hockey centre
 Mark Rypien (born 1962), Super Bowl XXVI MVP

S 
 Jamie Salé (born 1977), Olympic gold medalist skater
 Frank Sandercock (1887–1942), president of the Canadian Amateur Hockey Association
 Riza Santos (born 1987), Miss Universe Canada 2013
 Willie Saunders (1915–1986), Montana-born Hall of Fame jockey, won U.S. Triple Crown
 Andrew Schnell (born 1991), squash player
 Jeff Schultz (born 1986), ice hockey defenceman
 Mary Scott (born 1948), visual artist
 Patrick Sharp (born 1981), professional ice hockey player; born in Winnipeg but grew up in Calgary and later Thunder Bay, Ontario and Burlington, Vermont
 Cassie Sharpe (born 1992), freestyle skier
 Kyle Shewfelt (born 1982), gymnast; Olympic gold medalist
 Hunter Shinkaruk (born 1994), ice hockey winger
 Warren Shouldice (born 1983), freestyle skier
 Rhonda Sing (1961–2001), professional wrestler
 Julie Skinner (born 1968), curler and Olympic medalist
 Laurie Skreslet (born 1949), first Canadian to climb Mount Everest
 Lorna Slater (born 1975), Member of the Scottish Parliament and co-leader of the Scottish Green Party
 Tyler Sloan (born 1981), ice hockey defenceman
 Danielle Smith (born 1971), politician and radio talk show host
 Davey Boy Smith Jr. (born 1985), professional wrestler
 Jason Smith (born 1973), retired professional ice hockey player
 Nathan Smith (born 1985), biathlete
 Justin Snith (born 1991), luger
 Monte Solberg (born 1958), Conservative politician
 Brent Sopel (born 1977), professional ice hockey defenceman
 Mike Soroka (born 1997), professional baseball pitcher
 Ron Southern (1930–2016), businessman and founder of Spruce Meadows
 Brad Spence (born 1984), alpine skier
 Paul Spence, actor, portrays headbanger Dean Murdoch in FUBAR
 George Stanley (1907–2002), designer of the current Canadian flag
 Fiona Staples, comic book artist
 Stan Stephens (1929–2021), Canadian-American politician, former Governor of Montana
 Ron Stewart (1932–2012), ice hockey player
 Riley Stillman (born 1998), ice hockey player
 Charlie Storwick (born 1998), actress in Some Assembly Required; musician

T 
 Jeff Tambellini (born 1984), ice hockey player
 Ari Taub (born 1971), Olympic Greco-Roman wrestler
 Ken Taylor (1934–2015), Canadian ambassador to Iran; helped six Americans escape from Iran during the Iran hostage crisis under operation nicknamed Canadian Caper
 Mark Tewksbury (born 1968), Olympic gold medalist swimmer
 Robert Thirsk (born 1953), astronaut
 Paul Thompson (1906–1991), ice hockey forward
 Fikayo Tomori (born 1997), footballer (A.C. Milan, on loan from Chelsea)
 Michael Twoyoungmen, member of Canada's First Nations (the Tsuu T'ina)

U 
 Andrew Unger (born 1979), writer
 Garry Unger (born 1947), ice hockey centre

V 
 Shaun Van Allen (born 1967), former professional NHL player
 Alan van Sprang (born 1971), actor
 Chad VanGaalen (born 1977), musician
 Elisabeth Vathje (born 1994), skeleton racer
 Mike Vernon (born 1963), former professional National Hockey League player (won with the Calgary Flames in 1989)

W 
 Austin Wagner (born 1997), professional NHL hockey player
 Tristan Walker (born 1991), luger
 John Ware (1845–1905), pioneer rancher
 Bronwen Webster (born 1978), curler
 Crystal Webster (born 1975), curler
 Victor Webster (born 1973), actor
 Trevor White (born 1984), alpine skier
 Thomas Williams (born 1991), ice dancer
 TJ Wilson (born 1980), professional wrestler also known by his ring name as Tyson Kidd
 David Winning (born 1961), film and television director, Stargate: Atlantis, Andromeda, Syfy Channel movies
Cory Woron (born 1969), sports anchor, The Sports Network
 Jim Wych (born 1954), sports announcer and former professional snooker and pocket billiards player

See also

List of people from Edmonton
List of people from Laval, Quebec
List of people from Montreal
List of people from Quebec City
List of people from Toronto
List of people from Vancouver

References

 
Calgary
People
Calgary